Ark in the Park is an open sanctuary and conservation project in the Waitākere Ranges near Auckland. It is a partnership between Forest & Bird and Auckland Council that is supported by Te Kawerau ā Maki that aims to remove non-native pest mammals and predators and re-introduce species that were made extinct in the area.

History 

The project was started in 2002 by a small group of volunteers. A pilot programme covering 200 hectares was launched in 2003 which saw bait lines spaced 100m apart through the forest, with bait stations every 50m. By 2019, the project covered 2,270 hectares.

Species reintroduction 
A number of native bird species have been reintroduced to the park, beginning with whitehead and North Island robin. In 2007, hihi (stitchbird) were released, however the translocation was not successful. In the late 2000s, kokako were reintroduced to the area; having last been seen in the ranges in the 1950s.

References 

2002 establishments in New Zealand
Conservation projects in New Zealand
Nature reserves in New Zealand
Waitākere Ranges Local Board Area
West Auckland, New Zealand